The A76 is a major trunk road in south west Scotland.

Starting at Kilmarnock in East Ayrshire, the A76 goes through or immediately by-passes Hurlford, Mauchline, Auchinleck, Cumnock, Pathhead and New Cumnock before entering Dumfries and Galloway and continuing through Kirkconnel, Sanquhar, Mennock, Enterkinfoot, Carronbridge, Thornhill, Closeburn, Kirkpatrick, Auldgirth and Holywood before terminating at Dumfries. For the majority of its length (the portion from New Cumnock to Dumfries) it follows the valley of the River Nith which also lends its name to the historic district of Nithsdale.

References

Roads in Scotland
Transport in East Ayrshire
Transport in Dumfries and Galloway